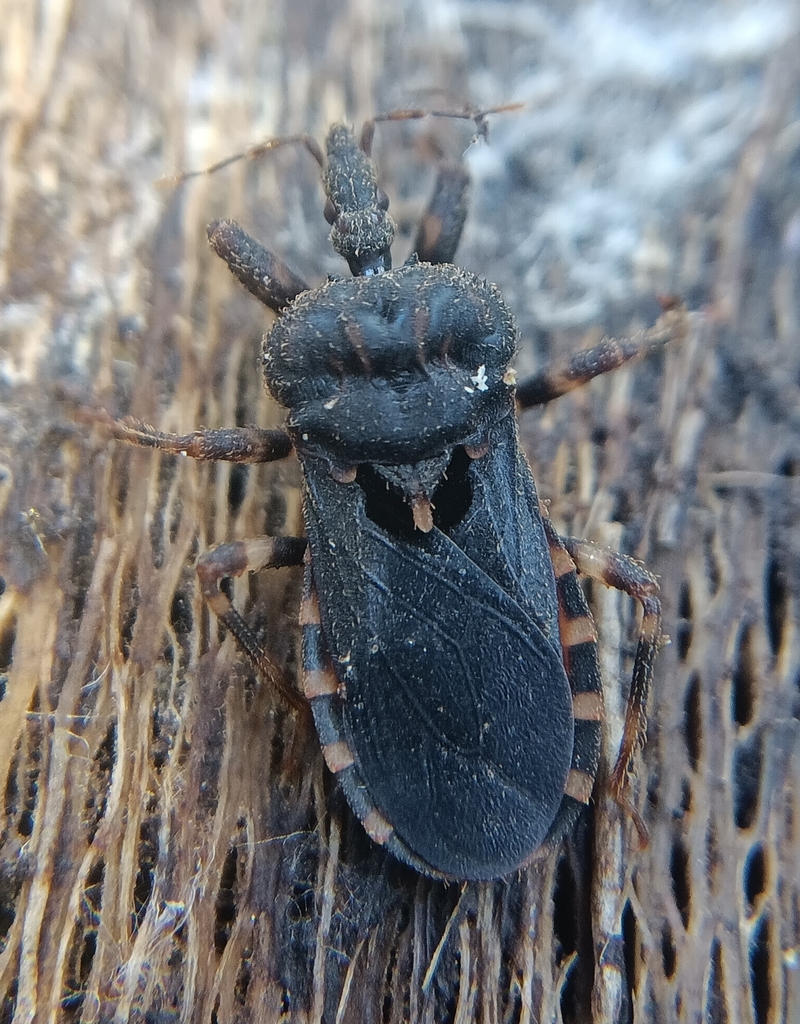

Scientific classification
- Kingdom: Animalia
- Phylum: Arthropoda
- Clade: Pancrustacea
- Class: Insecta
- Order: Hemiptera
- Suborder: Heteroptera
- Family: Reduviidae
- Genus: Physoderes
- Species: P. fuliginosa

Binomial name
- Physoderes fuliginosa (Stål, 1870)

= Physoderes fuliginosa =

Species of insect

Physoderes fuliginosa is a species of assassin bug native to Taiwan.

== Appearance ==
This species looks almost completely black with striped sides on winglike ends. The head is hairy, and the front legs have lining. The top scale is completely black with a little yellow line through it.
